Arian Nachbar (born 6 January 1977) is a German short track speed skater. He competed at the 1998 Winter Olympics, the 2002 Winter Olympics and the 2006 Winter Olympics.

References

1977 births
Living people
German male short track speed skaters
Olympic short track speed skaters of Germany
Short track speed skaters at the 1998 Winter Olympics
Short track speed skaters at the 2002 Winter Olympics
Short track speed skaters at the 2006 Winter Olympics
Sportspeople from Rostock